Joseph Benjamin Wilder (February 22, 1922 – May 9, 2014) was an American jazz trumpeter, bandleader, and composer.

Wilder was awarded the Temple University Jazz Master's Hall of Fame Award in 2006. The National Endowment for the Arts honored him with its highest honor in jazz, the NEA Jazz Masters Award for 2008.

Biography
Wilder was born into a musical family led by his father Curtis, a bassist and bandleader in Philadelphia. Wilder's first performances took place on the radio program "Parisian Tailor's Colored Kiddies of the Air". He and the other young musicians were backed up by such illustrious bands as Duke Ellington's and Louis Armstrong's that were also then playing at the Lincoln Theater. Wilder studied at the Mastbaum School of Music in Philadelphia, but turned to jazz when he felt that there was little future for an African-American classical musician. At the age of 19, Wilder joined his first touring big band, Les Hite's band.

Wilder was one of the first thousand African Americans to serve in the Marines during World War II. He worked first in Special Weapons and eventually became Assistant Bandmaster at the headquarters' band. Following the war during the 1940s and early 1950s, he played in the orchestras of Jimmie Lunceford, Herbie Fields, Sam Donahue, Lucky Millinder, Noble Sissle, Dizzy Gillespie, and finally with the Count Basie Orchestra. From 1957 to 1974, Wilder did studio work for ABC-TV, New York City, and in the pit orchestras for Broadway musicals, while building his reputation as a soloist with his albums for Savoy (1956) and Columbia (1959). His Jazz from Peter Gunn (1959), features ten songs from Henry Mancini ("Peter Gunn") television score in melodic and swinging fashion with a quartet. He was also a regular sideman with such musicians as NEA Jazz Masters Hank Jones, Gil Evans, and Benny Goodman. He became a favorite with vocalists and played for Billie Holiday, Lena Horne, Johnny Mathis, Harry Belafonte, Eileen Farrell, Tony Bennett, and many others. Wilder earned a bachelor of music degree in 1953, studying classical trumpet at the Manhattan School of Music with Joseph Alessi, where he was also principal trumpet with the school's symphony orchestra under conductor Jonel Perlea. In the 1960s, he performed on several occasions with the New York Philharmonic under Andre Kostelanetz and Pierre Boulez and  played lead for the Symphony Of The New World from 1965 to 1971.

He appeared on The Cosby Show episode "Play It Again, Russell" (1986), and played the trumpet in the Malcolm X Orchestra in Spike Lee's "Malcolm X" (1992). Since 1991 he returned as a leader and recorded three albums for Evening Star. He died on May 9, 2014, in New York City, of congestive heart failure.

Discography

As leader

As sideman
With Trigger Alpert
Trigger Happy! (Riverside, 1956)
With Count Basie
Dance Session (Clef, 1953)
With Louis Bellson and Gene Krupa
The Mighty Two (Roulette, 1963)
With Ruth Brown 
Miss Rhythm (Atlantic, 1959)
With Ralph Burns and Leonard Feather
Winter Sequence (MGM, 1954)
With Benny Carter
A Gentleman and His Music (Concord, 1985)
With Al Cohn
 Four Brass One Tenor (RCA Victor, 1955)
With Tadd Dameron
The Magic Touch (Riverside, 1962)
With Gil Evans
Into the Hot (Impulse!, 1961)
With Dizzy Gillespie
Gillespiana (Verve, 1960)
With Jimmy Giuffre
The Music Man (Atlantic, 1958)
With Urbie Green
All About Urbie Green and His Big Band (ABC-Paramount, 1956)
With Johnny Hartman
Once in Every Life (Bee Hive, 1980)
With Coleman Hawkins
The Hawk Talks (Decca, 1952-53 [1955])
With Johnny Hodges
Sandy's Gone (Verve, 1963)
With J. J. Johnson
J.J.! (RCA Victor, 1964)
With Etta Jones
From the Heart (Prestige, 1962)
With Hank Jones
Bluebird (Savoy, 1955)
With Quincy Jones
The Birth of a Band! (Mercury, 1959)
With Yusef Lateef
10 Years Hence (Atlantic, 1974)
The Doctor is In... and Out (Atlantic, 1976)
With John Lewis
Odds Against Tomorrow (Soundtrack) (United Artists, 1959)
The Golden Striker (Atlantic, 1960)
With Mundell Lowe
New Music of Alec Wilder (Riverside, 1956)
With Herbie Mann
Salute to the Flute (Epic, 1957)
With Les McCann
Comment (Atlantic, 1970)
Another Beginning (Atlantic, 1974)
With Oliver Nelson
Encyclopedia of Jazz (Verve, 1966)
The Sound of Feeling (Verve, 1966)
The Spirit of '67 with Pee Wee Russell (Impulse!, 1967)
With David Newman
The Weapon (Atlantic, 1973)
With Houston Person
Broken Windows, Empty Hallways (Prestige, 1972)
With Oscar Pettiford
Basically Duke (Bethlehem, 1954)
With A. K. Salim
Flute Suite (Savoy, 1957) with Frank Wess and Herbie Mann
Blues Suite (Savoy, 1958)
With Shirley Scott
Great Scott!! (Impulse!, 1964)
With Rex Stewart and Cootie Williams
Porgy & Bess Revisited (Warner Bros., 1959)
With Sonny Stitt
What's New!!! (Roulette, 1966)
With Ernie Wilkins
Top Brass (Savoy, 1955)
With Anita O'Day
Indestructible! (Kayo Stereophonics, 2006)
With Donna Hightower
Take One (Capitol, 1959)
With others
 Joe Newman: Hangin´ Out (Concord, 1984)
 Benny Carter: A Gentleman and His Music (Concord, 1985)
 Ruby Braff: Being With You (Arbirs, 1996)
 Charlie Byrd: For Louis''' (Concord, 1996)
 Jay Jay Johnson: The Brass Orchestra (Verve, 1996)
 The Heath Brothers: Jazz Family'' (Concord, 1998)

References

External links

Interview with Joe Wilder NAMM Oral History Library, February 26, 2006.

1922 births
2014 deaths
People from Delaware County, Pennsylvania
American classical trumpeters
American male trumpeters
American jazz trumpeters
American jazz composers
American male jazz composers
Musicians from Philadelphia
Jazz musicians from Pennsylvania
Classical musicians from Pennsylvania
Statesmen of Jazz members
United States Marine Corps personnel of World War II